The 2010 Dial Before You Dig Australian Six Hour was an endurance motor race for production cars. It was staged on 18 July 2010 at the Eastern Creek International Raceway in New South Wales, Australia and was Round 4 of both the 2010 Australian Manufacturers' Championship and the 2010 Australian Production Car Championship. The race was won by Stuart Kostera and Warren Luff at the wheel of a Mitsubishi Lancer Evo X, leading a 1–2–3–4 for the manufacturer. Kostera and Luff won by two laps ahead of Ian Tulloch and Steve Jones, with Peter Conroy and Mark Brame finishing a further lap down in third place.

Classes
As a round of the 2010 Australian Manufacturers' Championship, the race featured six classes:
 Class A : High Performance (All Wheel Drive)
 Class B : High Performance (Two Wheel Drive)
 Class C : Performance
 Class D : Production
 Class E : Production
 Class F : Alternative Energy 
There were no entries received for Class F.

Results

Note: Driver's name within brackets indicates driver did not actually drive the car in the race.

References

External links
 www.thenationals.com.au - Entry list
 www.facebook.com - images

Dial Before You Dig Australian Six Hour
Australian Production Car Championship
Motorsport at Eastern Creek Raceway
July 2010 sports events in Australia